3,4-Methylenedioxy-N-hydroxyamphetamine (MDOH, MDH, N-hydroxytenamphetamine) is an entactogen, psychedelic, and stimulant of the phenethylamine and amphetamine chemical classes. It is the N-hydroxy homologue of MDA, and the N-desmethyl homologue of MDHMA. MDOH was first synthesized and assayed by Alexander Shulgin. In his book PiHKAL (Phenethylamines i Have Known And Loved), Shulgin listed the dosage range as 100–160 mg, and the duration as approximately 3–6 hours. He describes MDOH as being very psychedelic and producing increased pleasure in beauty and nature. He also mentioned several negative side effects also seen with MDMA ("Ecstasy") such as difficulty urinating and internal dryness.

References

External links 
 MDOH entry in PiHKAL
 MDOH entry in PiHKAL • info

Substituted amphetamines
Designer drugs
Benzodioxoles
Serotonin-norepinephrine-dopamine releasing agents
Entactogens and empathogens
Hydroxylamines